The Federación Mexicana de Baloncesto (FMB), formerly known as the Federación Mexicana de Basquetbol, is a nationwide basketball federation in Mexico. It was established in 1936.

FMB participated in the formation of FIBA Americas, 1975. FMB is not recognized by FIBA, which accepted the ADEMEBA as the national basketball organization for Mexico.

The organization is directed by Agustín Villa.

See also
Asociación Deportiva Mexicana de Básquetbol

References

External links

Basketball in Mexico
Mex
1936 establishments in Mexico
Basketball
Sports organizations established in 1936